Bureti Constituency is an electoral constituency in Kenya. It is one of six constituencies of Kericho County. It was one of two constituencies of the former Buret District. The constituency was established for the 1963 elections.

Members of Parliament

References 

Constituencies in Kericho County
Constituencies in Rift Valley Province
1963 establishments in Kenya
Constituencies established in 1963